Jill Sudduth (born September 9, 1971 in Baltimore, Maryland) is an American competitor in synchronized swimming and Olympic champion. Sudduth attended college at San Jose State University.

She competed for the American team that received a gold medal in synchronized swimming at the 1996 Summer Olympics in Atlanta.

She received a gold medal in duet with Becky Dyroen-Lancer at the 1995 Pan American Games in Mar del Plata, Argentina.

References

External links
 
 
 

1971 births
Living people
American synchronized swimmers
Olympic medalists in synchronized swimming
Olympic gold medalists for the United States in synchronized swimming
Synchronized swimmers at the 1996 Summer Olympics
Medalists at the 1996 Summer Olympics
World Aquatics Championships medalists in synchronised swimming
Pan American Games gold medalists for the United States
Pan American Games medalists in synchronized swimming
Synchronized swimmers at the 1995 Pan American Games
Sportspeople from Baltimore
San Jose State University alumni
Medalists at the 1995 Pan American Games